Daydar-e Sofla (also Romanized as Dāydār-e Soflá, Daydar Sofla, and Dāidār Sufla; also known as Daidar, Dāydār, Daydar, Dāydār-e Pā’īn, and Dāyedār-e Pā’īn) is a village in Ijrud-e Pain Rural District, Halab District, Ijrud County, Zanjan Province, Iran. At the 2006 census, its population was 69, in 18 families.

References 

Populated places in Ijrud County